The I-85 Rivalry is a rivalry between the Atlanta Falcons and Carolina Panthers of the National Football League. The rivalry began in  when the Panthers joined as an expansion team. Atlanta holds a 35–21 lead in the series. The two teams have not met in the playoffs.

The Falcons and Panthers have won a combined 11 division titles since 1995 and each have made two Super Bowl appearances:  The Falcons in Super Bowls XXXIII and LI and the Panthers in Super Bowls XXXVIII and 50.  Neither team has won a Super Bowl championship.  Coincidentally, both teams lost their Super Bowls to the same two AFC teams:  the Denver Broncos and the New England Patriots. On the contrary, all 14 other NFC teams have won at least one NFL championship prior to the AFL–NFL merger, a Super Bowl trophy, or both.

It known as the "I-85 Rivalry" due to Atlanta and Charlotte being only four hours apart on Interstate 85.  Games between the two teams feature large contingents of visiting fans in both cities.

History

1995–99: Beginnings
Carolina's first ever regular season game was a tightly contested 23–20 overtime loss to the Falcons on September 3, 1995. This game was notable as NFL fans in the Carolinas who were formerly Falcons fans switched allegiance when the Panthers began play, filling up the Georgia Dome. The physical nature of the game contributed to an emotional experience for fans, setting the tone for the newly formed rivalry for years to come. As Falcons play-by-play announcer Wes Durham recalled, "I remember a lot of Panthers fans being there. I remember a lot of people from Charlotte, who had obviously driven down. And it was already being promoted as the 'I-85 Rivalry.' I remember that however they scored the touchdown towards the end of regulation it got loud. It was mostly Panthers fans." Later that season, Carolina defeated Atlanta 21–17 for their seventh win of the year–the most ever for an expansion franchise. Carolina faced Atlanta in the first regular season game played at Ericsson Stadium (now Bank of America Stadium) in 1996, which the Panthers won. Carolina won at home against the Falcons in each of its first three years as a franchise, carrying a 4–2 mark over Atlanta before the Falcons evened the series to 5–5 by the end of the 1990s.

2000s
In 2002, the Falcons and Panthers were moved to the NFC South along with the Tampa Bay Buccaneers and New Orleans Saints, adding intensity to the rivalry. Coming off their Super Bowl appearance in 1998, the Falcons began dominating the Panthers during the early 2000s. By the end of the 2004 season, Atlanta had won 9 of 10 meetings in the decade, with Carolina's only win coming during the year of its Super Bowl appearance in 2003. A notable game occurred in 2004, when the Falcons came back to beat the Panthers with a Michael Vick rushing touchdown followed by an interception of Jake Delhomme by the Falcons defense to set up the game-winning field goal. By 2007, the Panthers made it more even, sweeping the Falcons for the first time since 1997 in 2005, but were still 2–6 at home against Atlanta. Overall, the Falcons won 13 of 20 games in the series during the 2000s.

2010s
By 2011, Matt Ryan had long taken over at quarterback for the Falcons after Vick was involved in a dog-fighting scandal in 2007. The Panthers drafted Auburn quarterback Cam Newton first overall that year after 2010 draft pick Jimmy Clausen was an inadequate replacement for Jake Delhomme.

During the last week of the  season, the Panthers and Falcons faced each other in a must-win game for the NFC South division title and playoff berth. Despite Atlanta winning earlier in the season, Carolina handily won this game 34–3, becoming just the second team in NFL history to clinch a division title with a losing record at 7–8–1.

In week 16 of the  season, the Panthers came into Atlanta with a perfect 14-0 record opposed to the Falcons 7-7 record. Many anticipated the Falcons, who had started 6-1, but then went 1-7, would lose as they had two weeks ago, when they lost 38-0. The Falcons however shocked the Panthers and beat them with a final score of 20–13. Only the Falcons and the Denver Broncos in Super Bowl 50 beat the Panthers that season.

Game results

|-
| 
| Tie 1–1
| style="| Falcons  23–20(OT)
| style="| Panthers  21–17
| Tie  1–1
| Panthers join the NFL as an expansion team and are placed in the NFC West along with the Falcons.  The game in Atlanta was the Panthers' first game as an NFL franchise.
|-
| 
| Tie 1–1
| style="| Falcons  20–17
| style="| Panthers  29–6
| Tie  2–2
| Panthers open Ericsson Stadium (now known as Bank of America Stadium).
|-
| 
| style="| 
| style="| Panthers  9–6
| style="| Panthers  21–12
| Panthers  4–2
| 
|-
| 
| style="| 
| style="| Falcons  51–23
| style="| Falcons  19–14
| Tie  4–4
| Falcons lose Super Bowl XXXIII.
|-
| 
| Tie 1–1
| style="| Falcons  27–20
| style="| Panthers  43–28
| Tie  5–5
| 
|-

|-
| 
| style="| 
| style="| Falcons  13–12
| style="| Falcons  15–10
| Falcons  7–5
| 
|-
| 
| style="| 
| style="| Falcons  24–16
| style="| Falcons  10–7
| Falcons  9–5
| 
|-
| 
| style="| 
| style="| Falcons  41–0
| style="| Falcons  30–0
| Falcons  11–5
| Both teams realigned into the newly created NFC South. Falcons' 41–0 is the largest margin of victory in the series for either team.
|-
| 
| Tie 1–1
| style="| Falcons  20–14(OT)
| style="| Panthers  23–3
| Falcons  12–6
| Panthers lose Super Bowl XXXVIII.
|-
| 
| style="| 
| style="| Falcons  34–31(OT)
| style="| Falcons  24–10
| Falcons  14–6
| Falcons win 7 straight home meetings (1998–2004).
|-
| 
| style="| 
| style="| Panthers  44–11
| style="| Panthers  24–6
| Falcons  14–8
| 
|-
| 
| Tie 1–1
| style="| Panthers  10–3
| style="| Falcons  20–6
| Falcons  15–9
| 
|-
| 
| Tie 1–1
| style="| Panthers  27–20
| style="| Falcons  20–13
| Falcons  16–10
|  
|-
| 
| Tie 1–1
| style="| Falcons  45–28
| style="| Panthers  24–9
| Falcons  17–11
| 
|-
| 
| Tie 1–1
| style="| Falcons  28–20
| style="| Panthers  28–19
| Falcons  18–12
| 
|-

|-
| 
| style="| 
| style="| Falcons  31–10
| style="| Falcons  31–10
| Falcons  20–12
| Falcons clinch NFC South & home-field advantage in their home win.
|-
| 
| style="| 
| style="| Falcons  31–17
| style="| Falcons  31–23
| Falcons  22–12
| 
|-
| 
| Tie 1–1
| style="| Falcons  30–28
| style="| Panthers  30–20
| Falcons  23–13
| 
|-
| 
| style="| 
| style="| Panthers  21–20
| style="| Panthers  34–10
| Falcons  23–15
| Panthers clinch NFC South title in their away win.
|-
| 
| Tie 1–1
| style="| Panthers  34–3
| style="| Falcons  19–17
| Falcons  24–16
| Game in Atlanta was the final game of the season and winner-take-all game for the NFC South title.  The Panthers won the game to clinch the division and the Falcons missed the playoffs.
|-
| 
| Tie 1–1
| style="| Falcons  20–13
| style="| Panthers  38–0
| Falcons  25–17
| Falcons' win in Atlanta was the Panthers' only loss in a 15–1 regular season.  Panthers lose Super Bowl 50.
|-
| 
| style="| 
| style="| Falcons  48–33
| style="| Falcons  33–16
| Falcons  27–17
| Falcons lose Super Bowl LI.
|-
| 
| Tie 1–1
| style="| Falcons  22–10
| style="| Panthers  20–17
| Falcons  28–18
| Falcons open Mercedes-Benz Stadium. Falcons home win in week 17 clinches the final NFC Wild Card spot while also denying the Panthers the NFC South title.
|-
| 
| style="| 
| style="| Falcons  31–24
| style="| Falcons  24–10
| Falcons  30–18
| 
|-
| 
| style="|  
| style="| Falcons  40–20
| style="| Falcons  29–3
| Falcons  32–18
| 
|-

|-
| 
| 
| style="| Panthers  23–16
| style="| Falcons  25–17
| Falcons  33–19
| Falcons fired head coach Dan Quinn following game in Atlanta.
|-
| 
| 
| style="| Panthers  19–13
| style="| Falcons  29–21
| Falcons  34–20
| 
|-
| 
| 
| style="| Falcons  37–34(OT)
| style="| Panthers  25–15 
| Falcons  35–21
|
|- 

|-
| Regular season
| style="|
| 
| 
| 
|-

References 

National Football League rivalries
Atlanta Falcons
Carolina Panthers
Atlanta Falcons rivalries
Carolina Panthers rivalries